A Renko chart (also written  ) is a type of financial chart of Japanese origin used in technical analysis that measures and plots price changes.

Construction
Renko charting is similar to point-and-figure in that time doesn't play a role in Renko charts. Renko blocks (or bricks) are plotted using the following rules:

 A brick size is determined, e.g. 10 points. All bricks are drawn to be of that size.
 Once the price surpasses the lower or upper border of the current brick by the brick size, a new brick is drawn either above or below the previous one — never on the same line.
 The new brick is always drawn farther to the right on the horizontal axis.
 If the price surpasses the previous brick by more than one chosen size, the respective number of bricks is plotted on the chart.
 Partial bricks are not plotted until complete brick size distance is covered by the price.

Similarly to Kagi charts, Renko charts help chartists to cancel out the noise present on time-based charts, focus on important price levels, detect support and resistance, and identify market trends.

References

Financial charts
Japanese inventions